We Are an Empire, My Dear is the second album by Canadian band In-Flight Safety, released in 2009 on Night Danger Records. The album was produced by Laurence Currie and In-flight Safety. It was recorded primarily at Fox River School House No. 9, in Fox River, Nova Scotia, with additional recording in Halifax and Toronto, Ontario.

Critical reception 
Reviews have been mixed, with critics noting a similarity to the style of the band Coldplay.

Track listing 
All songs were written by In-Flight Safety; lyrics were written by John Mullane.
 "I Could Love You More"
 "Big White Elephant"
 "Model Homes"
 "Crash/Land"
 "Torches"
 "Actors"
 "Amy Racina"
 "Cloudhead"
 "Paperthin II"
 "Paperthin"
 "The Warning"
 "Fill Our Wounds"

Personnel 
 In-Flight Safety:
 Brad Goodsell
 Daniel Ledwell
 Glen Nicholson
 John Mullane
 Guest musicians:
 Kinley Dowling – viola and violin on tracks 1, 3, 10, 11 and 12
 Scott Remilia – vocals on tracks 1, 3, 4, 5, 6, 7, 8 and 10
 The Duffus Street Choir (Lia Rinaldo, Crad Price, Matt Charlton, Tara Thorne, Jenn Grant, Aaron Collier, Chris Pennell, Andrew Stretch, Craig Buckley, Ryan Turner, Jenna Higgins) – vocals on tracks 3 and 10

References 

2009 albums
In-Flight Safety albums